Roger F. Wendt (December 31, 1933 – March 30, 2011) was a Democratic member of the Iowa House of Representatives, representing the 2nd District from 2003 until 2011, though he stepped down from the Iowa House in February 2010 due to serious illness. He died on March 30, 2011, from lung cancer.

Wendt received his BA from Wayne State College, his MA from the University of South Dakota, and his Ed.D. from the University of South Dakota.

Wendt was elected in 2002 and re-elected in 2006 with 4,212 votes, running unopposed. In 2008 he won reelection by a margin of only 280 votes over Republican opponent Rick Bertrand.

When he stepped down, Wendt served on several committees in the Iowa House - the Human Resources, State Government, Transportation, and Ways and Means committees, as well as the Education committee, of which he was chair.  After he stepped down, he was moved to being vice chair of the Education committee for the remainder of the term.

He stepped down on February 1, 2010, due to lung cancer. He had survived cancer in his other lung 17 years earlier and been cancer-free since.  Wendt died on March 30, 2011, from lung cancer.

Electoral history
*incumbent

References

External links 

 
 
Wendt turns corner in cancer fight, Bret Hayworth, Sioux City Journal, July 9, 2010
Dr. Roger F. Wendt, Sioux City Journal, April 2, 2011

Democratic Party members of the Iowa House of Representatives
1933 births
2011 deaths
Wayne State College alumni
University of South Dakota alumni
People from Seward County, Nebraska
Politicians from Sioux City, Iowa
Deaths from lung cancer